The Chūgoku proportional representation block (比例中国ブロック) is one of eleven proportional representation (PR) "blocks", multi-member constituencies for the House of Representatives in the Diet of Japan. It consists of the prefectures of Tottori, Shimane, Okayama, Hiroshima, and Yamaguchi. Following the introduction of proportional voting, Chūgoku elected 13 representatives by PR in the 1996 general election, and 11 since the election of 2000.

Summary of results

List of representatives

References

Proportional representation electoral systems
Constituencies established in 1994
National Diet